James Cleland (7 October 1869 – 16 November 1942) was a Scottish footballer who played as an outside left.

Career
Cleland made one appearance for Liverpool, in the test match against Bury at the end of the 1894–95 season. Injuries to key players meant that Cleland got the chance to play for the club, following his loan from Edinburgh club St Bernard's.

Personal life
Cleland was born on 7 October 1869 in Glasgow to Matthew Cleland, a mercantile clerk, and Margaret Lithgow Cleland. Cleland married to Agnes Hutchison Rankin on 26 December 1901 in Glasgow. He died on 16 November 1942 in Glasgow at the age of 73.

References

1869 births
1942 deaths
English Football League players
Scottish footballers
Association football inside forwards
Scottish Football League players
Footballers from Glasgow
Third Lanark A.C. players
St Bernard's F.C. players
Liverpool F.C. players
Abercorn F.C. players
Partick Thistle F.C. players